Jakob Tower is a tourist watchtower located in the Char Fasson town of Bhola Island in southern Bangladesh. It is the tallest watchtower in Bangladesh as well as in the subcontinent. Built in the style of the Eiffel Tower, the 16-story watch tower can accommodate 50 visitors on each floor and 500 visitors throughout the tower.

Location
The Watch Tower is located in front of the Khasmahal Mosque on Char Fasson College Road, an Upazila town on the shores of the Bay of Bengal,  from Bhola district town.

Naming
It was not called Jakob Tower at the beginning of construction. Former Commerce Minister Tofail Ahmed visited the tower under construction on May 16, 2017, and was impressed by the construction style and aesthetic beauty of the tower and named it 'Jakob Tower'. The tower is named after Bhola-4 MP Abdullah Al Islam Jakob.

Construction and structure
Construction of the tower began in February 2013 at a cost about 20 crore BDT. Char Fasson Municipality has implemented a tower construction project on an acre of land. The tower was designed by architect Kamruzzaman Liton. From the ground up to the dome-shaped watchpoint at the top of the tower, there is 5 mm diameter transparent glass on the surrounding aluminium.

Tourism
An area of about  can be seen from the top of Jakob Tower. Binoculars are available to see distant places. From here you can see the protected forests of Char Kukri Mukri, Tarua Beach, Char Piyal of Swapnadwip Monpura, Hatiya's Nijhum Island and the Bay of Bengal.

References

Tourist attractions in Barishal Division
Char Fasson Upazila